Saint Nicholas Chapel is a Russian Orthodox chapel in Tsentralny City District of Novosibirsk, Russia.

History
Saint Nicholas Chapel was built in 1914–1915 by the architect Andrey Kryachkov.

In 1930, the church was demolished.

The chapel was restored in 1993 by the architect Pyotr Chernobrovtsev.

Gallery

References

Churches in Siberia
Russian Orthodox Church in Russia
Churches in Novosibirsk
Churches completed in 1915
Churches completed in 1993
Chapels in Russia